In American slang, baseball metaphors for sex are often used as euphemisms for the degree of physical intimacy achieved in sexual encounters or relationships. In the metaphor, first prevalent in the aftermath of World War II, sexual activities are described as if they are actions in a game of baseball. Baseball has also served as the context for metaphors about sexual roles and identity.

Running the bases
Among the most commonly used metaphors is the progress of a batter and base-runner in describing levels of physical intimacy (traditionally from a heterosexual perspective). Definitions vary, but the following are typical usages of the terms:
Strikeout – a failure to engage in any form of foreplay or other sexual activity;
First base – mouth-to-mouth kissing, especially French kissing;
Second base – skin-to-skin touching/kissing of the breasts; in some contexts, it may instead refer to touching any erogenous zones through the clothes (i.e., not actually touching the skin);
Third base – touching below the waist (without sexual intercourse) or manual stimulation of the genitals; in some contexts, it may instead refer to oral stimulation of the genitals;
Home run (home base or scoring) – "full" (penetrative) sexual intercourse

The metaphors are found variously in popular American culture, with one well-known example in the Meat Loaf song "Paradise by the Dashboard Light", which describes a young couple "making out", with a voice-over commentary of a portion of a baseball game, as a metaphor for the couple's activities. A similar example can be found in Billy Joel's song "Zanzibar" in which he compares himself to Pete Rose and sings the lines, "Me, I'm trying just to get to second base and I'd steal it if she only gave the sign. She's gonna give the go ahead, the inning isn't over yet for me." Trace Adkins's 2006 song "Swing" is based on the same concept.

Baseball positions are used as a coded reference to the roles played by men who have sex with men:

Pitcher  – the penetrative partner in anal sex
Catcher  – the receptive partner in anal sex

Similar metaphors for sexual identity include:

Switch hitter  – a bisexual individual, referencing a player who can bat from either side
Playing for the other team also Batting for the other team – indicating a person is gay or lesbian
Playing for both teams also Batting for both teams – indicating a person is bisexual

Views

The sequence of "running the bases" is often regarded as a script, or pattern, for young people who are experimenting with sexual relationships. The script may have slightly changed since the 1960s. Kohl and Francoeur state that with the growing emphasis in the 1990s on safe sex to expand sex beyond heterosexual penetrative intercourse, the "home run" has taken on the additional dimension of oral sex. Richters and Rissel conversely state that "third base" is now sometimes considered to comprise oral sex as part of the accepted pattern of activities, as a precursor to "full" (i.e. penetrative) sex. The use of baseball as a sexual script in general, regardless of what each base signifies, has been critiqued by sexuality educators for misrepresenting sex as a contest with a winner and loser.  Deborah Roffman writes that the baseball metaphor has been "insidiously powerful, singularly effective, and very efficient…as a vehicle for transmitting and transferring to successive generations of young people all that is wrong and unhealthy about American sexual attitudes."

There are conflicting perspectives on the use of the baseball metaphor as a part of sex education. Some educators have found the baseball metaphor an effective instructional tool when providing sex education to middle school students. Supporters of baseball metaphors in sex education include Leman and Bell. In their book A Chicken's Guide to Talking Turkey With Your Kids About Sex, they use a baseball metaphor to aid parents in the discussion of puberty with their children, dividing the topics into "first base" ("Changes from the neck up"), "second base" ("Changes from the neck to the waist"), "third base" ("Changes from the waist down"), and "home plate" ("The Big 'It). Others argue that the baseball metaphor reflects U.S. ideas about sex as a contest to be won, rather than a mutual and consensual activity. These critiques suggest that other metaphors might be more useful for explaining sexual consent and pleasure. Alternative metaphors and a critique of the baseball metaphor are offered in the sex education materials provided by Scarleteen.

See also

Glossary of English-language idioms derived from baseball

References

External links
 

American slang
Baseball culture
Metaphors referring to sport
Sexual acts
Sexual slang